Ba'al-Perazim (Hebrew Owner of Breakings Through) was a place in ancient Israel.

It was the scene of a victory gained by David over the Philistines (2 Samuel 5:20; 1 Chronicles 14:11). It is called Mount Perazim in Isaiah 28:21. It was near the Valley of Rephaim, west of Jerusalem. 

Some scholars suggest a site 4 km northwest of Jerusalem, named Sheikh Bodr, to be identical with Ba'al-Perazim.

There is also a valley near Mount Sodom in the Judaean Desert, called "Wadi Perazim".

Etymology
It is not certain whether the occurrence in 2 Sam.5:20 name is:
(a) a word play - David is punning on an existing local name.
(b) an anachronism - such as "Abraham came to Dan" Genesis 14:14.
Yoshitaka Kobayashi considers it an anachronism, but the use of Baal rather than El may indicate a play on an existing local name.

If the reference is to Mt. Perazim in Isaiah 28 then that suggests a mountain with a high ground position for David to attack. Alternatively, since David says "Yahweh burst-through" (פָּרַץ יְהוָה) "like bursting of waters" (פֶרֶץ מָיִם) it may be a reference to waters.

Cultural Influences
This place name is the origin of term "God of the Breakthrough" in the Gospel music song of that name by Robert Critchley, sung by Lara George.

References

Hebrew Bible places
Hebrew Bible battles